Lake Tahoma is a private lake in the mountains of Western North Carolina, United States, in McDowell County. It is fed by the waters of Buck Creek, a tributary of the Catawba River. The lake is about 5 miles northwest of Marion.

Notes

Tahoma
Bodies of water of McDowell County, North Carolina